The Staunton–Morphy controversy concerns the failure of negotiations in 1858 for a chess match between Howard Staunton and Paul Morphy and later interpretations of the actions of the two players. The details of the events are not universally agreed, and accounts and interpretations often show strong national bias.

Continuing uncertainties and controversy
In the words of chess journalist Mark Weeks, "Staunton represents a unique challenge to chess history. Many players immediately associate his name with Paul Morphy, as in 'Staunton ducked a match with Morphy'. ... This is extremely unfair, as it concentrates the focus on Staunton to a relatively minor, factually controversial incident, while it ignores his significant achievements." As Edward Winter writes, "The issue of national bias does, unfortunately, require consideration in the Staunton–Morphy affair." When editing World Chess Champions (Oxford, 1981), Winter chose an Englishman to write about Staunton and an American to write about Morphy.

Backgrounds of the players

Staunton

Howard Staunton (April 1810 – June 22, 1874) was an English chess master who won a match  in Paris in 1843 against the Frenchman Pierre Charles Fournier de Saint-Amant, and was regarded as the world's strongest player from 1843 to 1851 by many contemporary commentators, by later 19th-century commentators and by former world champion Garry Kasparov. According to match records collected by Jeremy P. Spinrad, the only players who were successful against Staunton without receiving odds from 1840 to 1851 were: Saint-Amant, who won the first and lost the second and longer of their matches in 1843; Adolf Anderssen, who eliminated Staunton from the 1851 London International tournament and won the event; and Elijah Williams, who beat Staunton in the play-off for third place in the same tournament. The statistical website Chessmetrics ranks Staunton as world number one from May 1843 to August 1849, in the top ten from July 1851 to May 1853, and in the top five from June 1853 to January 1856.

Staunton proposed and was the principal organizer of the 1851 London International Tournament, which was the first ever international tournament. His disappointing fourth place in the tournament may indicate that he had over-loaded himself by being both Secretary of the organizing committee and a competitor. The 1851 tournament and his subsequent match against Williams effectively ended Staunton's competitive career. Although Anderssen, who won the tournament, accepted Staunton's challenge for a match after the tournament, circumstances prevented them from playing it. In 1853 while in Brussels, Staunton played an impromptu match against von der Lasa but had to abandon it because of heart trouble, and von der Lasa later wrote that in his opinion Staunton had no chance of being physically fit enough for serious competition after 1853.

Staunton was also an influential chess journalist and writer of chess books, and in 1847 embarked on an additional career as a Shakespearean scholar, gaining the respect of his contemporaries and of modern writers in that field also. After the end of his competitive chess career, he remained an active writer about both chess and Shakespeare until his death, and was at work when he died.

Morphy

Paul Morphy (June 22, 1837 – July 10, 1884) was an American chess prodigy who learned the game as a young child simply from watching others play. In 1850, when Morphy was twelve, the strong professional Hungarian chess master Johann Löwenthal visited New Orleans where Morphy beat him 3–0. Morphy played little chess in his teens, concentrating instead on his studies, but was invited to play in the 1857 American Chess Congress. This was a knock-out tournament in which each round was a mini-match. Morphy, then 20 years old, lost only one game (to Louis Paulsen) while drawing three, two of them in the final which he won 6–2 (5 wins, one loss, and two draws) against Louis Paulsen, a German-American whom Chessmetrics rates as one of the world's top 10 from the late 1850s to the early 1890s.

The New Orleans Chess Club then issued a challenge on Morphy's behalf for a match against Staunton, who was still famous for his dominance in the late 1840s and for his influential chess writings. Morphy and his friends took Staunton's response to be an acceptance of the challenge, and Morphy set off for England in mid-1858.

While the negotiations with Staunton dragged on, Morphy spent most of his time in London and Paris, where he achieved crushing victories against other top players of the time: 10–4 against Löwenthal; 5½–2½ against Daniel Harrwitz; 8–3 against Adolf Anderssen, who had won the 1851 London International Tournament and later won the 1862 London Tournament; and 7½–½ in 1859 against Augustus Mongredien.

Morphy proved so much stronger than his contemporaries that Chessmetrics rates him the world's top player from 1858 until early 1862, 3 years after Morphy announced his retirement from chess. It is difficult to compare Morphy objectively with more recent top-class players because he was so far ahead of his opponents.

The events of 1858

Initial challenge and response
In the mid-1850s Staunton obtained a contract with the publishers Routledge to edit the text of Shakespeare. This edition appeared in parts from 1857 to 1860, and Staunton's work was praised by experts. While Staunton was busy with the Shakespeare edition, he received a courteous letter from the New Orleans Chess Club, inviting him to that city to play Paul Morphy, who had won the 1857 First American Chess Congress; This challenge, which was sent in February 1858, proposed that the stake should be $5,000 and that, if Staunton lost, he would be paid $1,000 to cover expenses. The proposed stake would be worth about $877,145.92 in 2007's money. Interestingly, the Chess Club had not negotiated with Morphy before sending the letter.

Staunton replied on April 4, 1858:

On the same day Staunton wrote in his column in the Illustrated London News:

There has been debate ever since about whether Staunton's letter and article should be regarded as a polite refusal or a conditional acceptance of the challenge. Morphy, however, took Staunton's writing as a challenge. Although Staunton had not said anything about playing against Morphy, Morphy assumed that the match could easily be arranged once he just got to England.

Samuel Boden, who was then the chess editor of The Field, a prestigious English countryside and sporting magazine, disputed the Americans' selection of Staunton as representing the best that Europe had to offer:

Staunton did offer to play Morphy by electric telegraph, a technology whose progress and uses for chess he reported enthusiastically. However this offer arrived after Morphy had left for Europe – which perhaps was fortunate, as the newly laid cable broke down after a month and was not replaced until 1866.

Morphy sets off for Europe
When Morphy left New Orleans for Europe on May 31, 1858, he was still legally a minor, and would come of age on June 22, 1858. Hence he required his family's permission for the journey. However his immediate family opposed the trip on the grounds that it would delay his entry into the legal profession, and it took some time for one uncle and a family friend to persuade them to let him go. The New Orleans Chess Club also played a notable part in trying to persuade Morphy's family into letting him travel; it also offered to pay Morphy's travel expenses, but he declined this offer since he did not want to be seen as a professional chess player.

Morphy's explanation for the voyage was that he intended to play in the chess tournament that had been scheduled for 22 June 1858 in Birmingham. Staunton welcomed the news that "Mr. Paul Morphy has definitely settled to visit England and attend the meeting of the British Association at Birmingham...", which was the published aim of Morphy's visit.

After Morphy's arrival in England
Morphy arrived in Liverpool on June 20, 1858, and immediately caught the train to Birmingham. However, on arrival he found that the tournament had been postponed by two months, to August 24. Morphy traveled to London the following day but had fallen ill, and was not fit to visit the London chess clubs until June 23. The Illustrated London News, of which Staunton was the chess editor, printed an article "Arrival of Mr. Morphy" on June 26. At the St. George's club he met Staunton and re-issued the challenge, which Staunton accepted provided he was given a month to prepare. Although he declined to play a few casual games against Morphy, Staunton invited him to his home in Streatham, which in those days was a country village whose first railway station had opened only two years earlier. There they played a couple of consultation games, with Staunton partnered by John Owen and Morphy by Thomas Wilson Barnes. The Morphy-Barnes team defeated Staunton-Owen in both consultation games. A little later Staunton proposed that they delay their match until after the Birmingham tournament in August, and Morphy reluctantly agreed. Staunton announced in the Illustrated London News:

Around this time Morphy wrote asking friends in the US to send him the money for the stake. However, in late July 1858 his family informed his friend Charles Maurian that "they had resolved not only not to help  raising the amount wanted but that moreover they should not allow him to play a money match either with his own money or anyone else's ... that he will be brought home by force if necessary; that they were determine to prevent a money match by all means." Maurian persuaded New Orleans Chess Club to send £500, but apparently it was not in Morphy's hands until early October.

Meanwhile, Morphy played and beat Johann Löwenthal. According to Morphy's personal assistant Frederick Edge, personal and political conflicts appeared around this time. Edge wrote that Owen, who was Morphy's second in this match, encouraged Löwenthal and disparaged Morphy, and that in disgust Morphy challenged Owen to a match, offering him odds of Pawn and move. Edge further claimed that Morphy insisted on giving odds because, if he played Owen at evens, Staunton would treat this as an excuse for delaying or abandoning the match with Morphy. The match with Löwenthal was interrupted as Löwenthal fell ill, and Morphy used the break to crush Owen 5–0 with two draws, despite the fact that Owen was a very strong player who later took third place in the 1862 London tournament and was the only player to win a game against the victor, Adolf Anderssen. In early August Staunton allowed a committee to be formed at the St. Georges' Chess Club to raise money for his share of the stake.

After finishing the match with Löwenthal, on 14 August 1858 Morphy wrote to Staunton:

Staunton replied that he needed more time to prepare, and Morphy wrote to him again:

Chess historian G. H. Diggle wrote that, since 21 August 1858 was a Saturday and there was no mail delivery on Sundays, Morphy's letter would have arrived no earlier than the following Monday, when Staunton had to leave for Birmingham. Meanwhile, on Sunday 22 August Staunton's old enemy George Walker published an article in Bell's Life in London that accused Staunton of trying to postpone the match indefinitely:

On Saturday 28 August the Illustrated London News carried a letter signed by "Anti-book", which said:

It is generally thought that "Anti-book" was Staunton himself. Diggle argued that Staunton must have dashed this off before catching the Birmingham train, as he was busy playing in the tournament on the 24th and 25th, while the 26th would have been too late for publication on the 28th; and that Staunton would have read Walker's attack on him before seeing Morphy's letter of 21 August.

Meanwhile, Morphy traveled to Birmingham, arriving on 26 August, too late to play in the tournament, but in time for a blindfold exhibition which he had previously offered to give at Queen's College on 27 August. When he met Staunton there, Staunton asked for more time, saying that his commitments to his publishers were taking up a lot of his time. Morphy asked, "Mr. Staunton, will you play in October, in November, or December? Choose your own time but let the decision be final." Staunton replied, "Well, Mr. Morphy, if you will consent  to the postponement, I will play you the beginning of November. I will see my publishers and let you know the exact date in a few days."

Morphy used the postponement by travelling to Paris, where he beat Daniel Harrwitz (5½–2½). On 6 October 1858, Morphy wrote Staunton an open letter which was also circulated to several publications, in which Morphy stated his view of the situation:

On October 7, Morphy wrote to the St. George's Chess Club:

On October 9, Staunton replied to Morphy's letter open letter of October 6, re-stating the difficulties he faced, but now using them as reasons to cancel the match:

On October 23, Staunton published his entire reply of October 9 along with a partial copy of Morphy's open letter of October 6,  omitting the reference to the "Anti-book" letter about Morphy's lack of funds and seconds. Various chess columns then printed anonymous and acrimonious letters. Morphy took no part in any of this, but wrote to Lord Lyttelton, the president of the British Chess Association, explaining his own efforts to bring about the match, Staunton's efforts to avoid the match with everything short of admitting he didn't wish to play, and of Staunton's representation of the facts in the Illustrated London News, demanding "that you shall declare to the world it is through no fault of mine that this match has not taken place." Lyttelton replied:

Aftermath

After returning to New Orleans in 1859, Morphy declared himself retired from the game and, with a few exceptions, gave up public competition for good. Morphy's embryonic law career was disrupted in 1861 by the outbreak of the American Civil War. Possibly because of his opposition to the secession of the Confederacy, Morphy was unable to successfully build a law practice even after the war ended. He became eccentric, reclusive and perhaps mildly insane, and died at the age of 47 from a stroke brought on by entering a cold bath after a long walk in the midday heat.

Staunton continued his twin careers as a chess writer and Shakespearean scholar. The City of London Chess Magazine wrote, "... it is no exaggeration to say that his literary labours are the basis upon which English Chess Society, as at present constituted, stands", and eminent contemporaries including Morphy and Steinitz considered Staunton's writings on chess openings to be among the best of their time. His work as a Shakespearean scholar gained the respect of his contemporaries and of modern writers in that field also. After the end of his competitive chess career he remained an active writer about both chess and Shakespeare until his death, and was at work when he died.

Both players expressed respect for each other's abilities. Morphy said that Staunton had great analytical ability and judgement of positions but his play showed a lack of imagination, and that Staunton may have been the strongest player of his time. In 1860, Staunton published Chess Praxis, which was a supplement to his 1847 work The Chess Player's Handbook. In the new book he devoted 168 pages to presenting many of Morphy's games and praised the play of the American.

20th century and recent comments
Staunton has been a controversial figure ever since his own time. Reaching an objective assessment is made more difficult by the fact that some well-known chess writers, including Fred Reinfeld, Israel "Al" Horowitz and Reuben Fine, have been criticized by chess historians for their lack of accuracy, both in general and specifically where Staunton is concerned. Edward Winter writes, "It is unwise for the 'non-playing' historian to publish his own analysis, although he may be a useful compiler. Similarly, players who are unversed in, and indifferent to, chess history should not touch it."

Reinfeld, Horowitz and Fine also condemned Staunton's play, but Bobby Fischer praised it highly.

Chess historians Edward Winter and G. H. Diggle trace much of the 20th-century animosity against Staunton to books by Philip W. Sergeant (1872–1952) about Paul Morphy. Sergeant in turn made use of a book by Frederick Edge, who accompanied Morphy to Europe in 1858 as his secretary and personal assistant, but returned to the USA in January 1859, a few months before Morphy. Edge's attitude to Morphy was unusual and complex:
Opinions of Edge's value as a historical source vary widely:
A review in The Chess Monthly (New York) of The Exploits and Triumphs in Europe, of Paul Morphy ... said, "Mr. Morphy expressly disclaims any connection with it in any way or manner. ... will afford the reader a half-hour's entertainment," and noted the misspelling of some chess masters' names. The historian H. J. R. Murray described Edge's book as "rather ill-natured" and "deals with the Staunton–Morphy episode in a strongly anti-Staunton manner", and Edge himself as "most unreliable of writers" (reviewing Edge's comments about Sarratt, a noted English player and chess writer around 1800–1820). David Hooper, one of the co-authors of The Oxford Companion to Chess , wrote, "Edge also found it profitable to invent baddies (Staunton, Harrwitz). As a consequence Harrwitz lost his job at the Café de la Régence." Hooper's co-author Ken Whyld wrote, "Edge was a proven liar whose book on Morphy ... is often relied upon for unsubstantiated facts."
David Lawson's book Paul Morphy: The Pride and Sorrow of Chess (New York, 1976) makes extensive use of Edge's book, and points out that, without Edge, there would be very little information about Morphy's activities in Europe, as Morphy was averse to publicity. However Lawson also suggests that Morphy had seen the manuscript of Edge's book, disliked its treatment of the Staunton affair so much that he disavowed it, and objected to Edge's treatment of other matters.
Although Sergeant used Edge's book as a source, he expressed some reservations: "Edge, though English by birth, was very biased against Staunton; but we can hardly think that his prejudice went so far as to allow him to falsify the evidence"; "Edge, however, is not altogether trustworthy, being bitterly prejudiced against Staunton"; "my own reading of Edge did not lead me to think him a liar; though I cannot deny his anti-Staunton bias".

H. J. R. Murray commented on the whole affair, "In all this there is but little in which we can reproach Staunton, beyond the fact that he kept open the possibility of a match for so long, and even here there is a good deal that could be urged in justification of the course followed by Staunton" but also noted that both sides were playing tactical games with each other in front of the public, and that comments made by both players or their respective supporters were acrimonious.

Notes

History of chess

External links
 Edward Winter's "A Debate on Staunton, Morphy and Edge" (Chess Notes Feature Article)
 "The Staunton-Morphy Controversy" by Edward Winter